Sedaris is a surname. Notable people with the surname include:

 Amy Sedaris (born 1961), American actress, author, and comedian
 David Sedaris (born 1956), American humorist, comedian, author, and radio contributor

See also
 Jason Sudeikis
 Neil Sedaka